İskenderun FK, formerly known as Erzinspor and Erzin Belediyespor, is a football club based in İskenderun, Turkey. The club was founded in 1978 as Erzinspor in Erzin. İskenderun FK competes in the TFF Second League.

The club were promoted to the TFF Third League after the 2013–14 season by defeating 44 Malatyaspor in the playoffs, after they finished 1st in the 3rd group of the Turkish Regional Amateur League. The team was bought by Şaban Hakan Bolat during the season, and in 2021, İskenderunspor A.Ş. took its name and went to restructuring. For the restructuring, Ümit Karan was appointed as the manager and Jan Olde Riekerink was appointed as the general manager of the club.

League participations 
TFF Second League: 2022–present
TFF Third League: 2014–2022
Turkish Regional Amateur League: 2010–2014

League performances 

Source: TFF: Erzin Belediyespor

Current squad

Other players under contract

Out on loan

References

External links 
İskenderun FK on TFF.org

TFF Third League clubs
Football clubs in Hatay
Association football clubs established in 1978
1978 establishments in Turkey